Antonio Orlando Rodríguez (born Ciego de Ávila, 30 June 1956) is a Cuban writer, journalist and critic. Born in Havana, he studied journalism at the University of Havana. The author of numerous books for children and young adults, he also writes literary fiction for grown-ups. He won the Premio Alfaguara for his 2008 novel Chiquita, based on the life of Espiridiona Cenda.

References 

Cuban male novelists
1956 births
Living people
Cuban fantasy writers